A Hearty Response is a 1986 Hong Kong romantic comedy and action thriller film directed by Norman Law and starring Chow Yun-fat, Joey Wong and David Lui.

Plot
Kong-sang is a mainland Chinese girl who illegally entered Hong Kong, hoping to retrieve her birth certificate, which proves that she was actually born in Hong Kong. She flees from her smuggler, Shing (Shum Wai), after she injures him when she was harassed by him.

Meanwhile, police detective Ho Ting-pong (Chow Yun-fat) is an upright and virtuous police officer who was assigned with his partner, Long Man (David Lui), to arrest drug dealer Addict Hung (Ng Hong-sang) in a supermarket. There, Long Man sees Kong-sang stealing from the supermarket and arrests her. As Ting-pong was distracted by this, Addict Hung manages to get on a car and runs over Kong-sang before fleeing.

After regaining consciousness in the hospital, Kong-sang feigns amnesia to avoid being repatriated and identifies Ting-pong as her husband. Since Ting-pong is a man of chivalry, he takes Kong-sang home and takes care of her. Ting-pong's mother (Lee Heung-kam) is really fond of Kong-sang and sees her as an ideal daughter-in-law. However, when Ting-pong's mother convinces him into letting Kong-sang stay, Kong-sang leaves to wander in the streets, not wanting to give Ting-pong a hard time to face his girlfriend. After going through many trials and tribulations, Ting-pong and Kong-sang eventually fall in love. As everything is seemingly going well, Shing reappears and kidnaps Kong-sang.

Cast
Chow Yun-fat as Ho Ting-pong
Joey Wong as Kong-sang
David Lui as Long Man
Kent Cheng as Policeman outside bank (cameo)
Wong Wan-si as Auntie Wan (cameo)
Paul Chun as Chief Inspector Lui Tak
Poon Lai-yin as Judy
Lee Heung-kam as Ho Ting-pong's mother
Shum Wai as Shing
Felix Lok as Restaurant manager
Ng Hong-sang as Addict Hung
Chiu Chi-ling as Doctor
Siao San-yan as Wan's husband
Ng Kwok-kin as Policeman
Fei Pak as Policeman
Danny Tang
Leo Tsang
Lung Ying

Reception

Critical
LoveHKFilm gave the film a mixed review describing the film as "forgettable", with "some decent moments." Hong Kong Film Net gave the film a score of 5 out of 10 criticizing director Norman Law's direction and its unfunny comedy, but noting the good chemistry of Chow Yun-fat and Joey Wong.

Box office
The film grossed HK$13,461,667 at the Hong Kong box office during its theatrical run from 10 October to 20 November 1986.

See also
Chow Yun-fat filmography

References

External links

A Hearty Response at Hong Kong Cinemagic

1986 films
1980s action thriller films
1986 romantic comedy films
1980s comedy thriller films
Hong Kong action thriller films
Hong Kong romantic comedy films
Police detective films
1980s Cantonese-language films
Golden Harvest films
Films about immigration
Films set in Hong Kong
Films shot in Hong Kong
1980s Hong Kong films